{{Infobox school
 | name                    = Sherfield School
 | image                   = Sherfield School logo.png
 | image_size              = 
 | alt                     = 
 | caption                 = 
 | motto                   = "Ad Vitam Paramus"
 | established             = 
 | closed                  = 
 | type                    = Private day and boarding
 | trust                   = 
 | religious_affiliation   = 
 | president               = 
 | head_label              = Headmaster
 | head                    = Nick Brain
 | r_head_label            = 
 | r_head                  = 
 | chair_label             = 
 | chair                   = 
 | founder                 = 
 | medium                  = 
 | address                 = 
 | location                = Sherfield on Loddon
 | city                    = 
 | district                = 
 | postcode                = RG27 0HU
 | county                  = Hampshire
 | country                 = England
 | local_authority         = 
 | dfeno                   = 850/6084
 | urn                     = 134769
 | ofsted                  = 
 | staff                   = 
 | capacity                = 
 | enrolment               = 
 | gender                  = Coeducational
 | lower_age               = 3 months
 | upper_age               = 18 years
 | houses                  = Buckfield, Wynstow, Lydney, Loddon
 | colours                 =  Navy Blue, Silver, White
 | publication             = 
 | free_label_1            = 
 | free_1                  = 
 | free_label_2            = 
 | free_2                  = 
 | free_label_3            = 
 | free_3                  = 
 | website                 = http://www.sherfieldschool.co.uk/
}}

Sherfield School is a coeducational private day and boarding school, located in Sherfield Manor by Sherfield on Loddon in Hampshire, England. It is operationally managed by the Bellevue Education Group Ltd.

Until 2003 the site was the location of the North Foreland Lodge girls boarding school, founded in 1909; and settled at Sherfield Manor in 1947.

Site history 
The Sherfield Manor House site has history back to the early 12th century, when it was part of the manor of Odiham, but at some time before 1167 it was granted by Henry II to his Marshall, William FitzAldelm.
This created the manor of Sherfield upon Loddon; it is possible that William Fitz Aldelm built the first Manor House.

Until the 19th century, the manor of Sherfield upon Loddon passed between various noble families, including the Marquises of Winchester and later the Dukes of Wellington. In the 16th century, a country house known as Archer Lodge was built on the site of the Sherfield manor house and was later the residence of Paynton Pigott Stainsby Conant, a rich landowner. In 1870 this house was demolished by John Bramston Stane, who built a new house in a Victorian style, called Buckfield, in the middle of a wood of the same name. In 1880, the house was renamed as Sherfield Manor and by 1897 had been further extended.

The Liddell family acquired the manor house in 1908 and were the last owners to hold manorial courts, responsible for minor offences, local administration, and the regulation and customs of the Sherfield upon Loddon manor. Their son, John Aidan Liddell, a pilot in the Royal Flying Corps, won both the Military Cross and the Victoria Cross for gallantry during the First World War and died from the wounds he had suffered in winning the VC.

School history 
In 1947 (following its use as a military hospital in the Second World War), the Sherfield Manor site was purchased and operated by North Foreland Lodge, a girls' boarding school previously based in North Foreland, Kent. The North Foreland Lodge girls' boarding school used this site as a school from 1947 until 2003.

In 2001-2002, Gordonstoun School of Scotland sought to acquire the school with the support of some of the North Foreland Lodge governors, and the success of this bid was announced in March 2002, when it was revealed that a new prep school was to be built within the school grounds and that North Foreland would continue as a girls-only senior school. However, having paid only £1 million for the school, in 2003 Gordonstoun closed it, soon selling the land and buildings for £6 million.

The Gems Education group relaunched the site as Sherfield School in September 2004. Lucy Ward, writing in The Guardian, said that "this apparently traditional English independent school represents one face of a thrusting young newcomer causing ripples in the UK's private education market - the Dubai-based Global Education Management Systems", and noted that Gems is known overseas "for offering a distinctive brand of no-frills, low-cost private education". According to a Freedom of Information Request the school withdrew from the Teacher's Pension Scheme on 31 August 2020.

Headteachers
 James Murphy O'Connor (Headmaster), 2004 - 2009 
 Dr. Pat Preedy (Executive Principal), 2004 - 2012 
 Richard Jaine  (Head Master), 2012 - 2017 
 Nick Fisher (Head Master), 2017 - 2018
 Christopher James-Roll, (Acting Head Master) 2018
 Nick Brain, (Headmaster) 2018 -

References

External links
Sherfield School home page
GEMS Education
National Curriculum online official website
Department for Education and Skills (England)''
Independent Schools Association
Independent Schools Council

Educational institutions established in 2004
Private schools in Hampshire
GEMS schools
2004 establishments in England